Oleksandr Pikhur (born 25 August 1982, Ukraine) is a professional Ukrainian football striker who plays for Kharkiv in the Ukrainian Premier League.

External links 
 Official Website Profile

1982 births
Living people
Ukrainian footballers
FC Hoverla Uzhhorod players
FC Kharkiv players
Association football forwards